Crisanto España (born October 25, 1964 in Venezuela) is a former boxer who was the WBA welterweight champion of the world. 

España fought out of Belfast, Northern Ireland and turned pro in 1984 after accumulating a 54-10 amateur record. España impressively won his first 30 fights, including the WBA Welterweight Title with an upset TKO in the 8th round over Meldrick Taylor in 1992. He successfully defended the title twice before being stopped by Ike Quartey in the 11th round in 1994. España fought only once more, in Northern Ireland in 1995 and retired with a record of 31-1-0 with 25 KOs.

He has two children named; Crisanto and Nico Espana.

His older brother Ernesto España was the World Boxing Association lightweight champion in 1979 and 1980.

See also 
 List of WBA world champions

External links 
 

1964 births
Living people
Welterweight boxers
World boxing champions
Venezuelan male boxers